The 2006 European Seniors Fencing Championship was held in İzmir, Turkey, between 4 July and 9 July 2006. The event, sanctioned by the European Fencing Confederation (EFC), was organized by the Turkish Fencing Federation (TEF). 
382 senior fencers from 37 European countries competed in the championship's foil, épée, and sabre events. Russia was the most successful nation, followed by Hungary and Romania. This was the first time that the championship was hosted by Turkey.

Venue

İzmir is the third largest city of Turkey.  The competitions took place in İzmir Halkapınar Sport Hall, a multi-purpose hall with a capacity of around 9,000 persons, completed in 2005.

Medal summary

Men's events

Women's events

Medal table

Results

Men

Individual foil

Individual épée

Individual sabre

Women

Individual foil

Individual épée

Individual sabre

References
 Results at the European Fencing Confederation

External links
 Turkish Fencing Federation (TEF) official website
 European Fencing Confederation (EFC) official website

E
2006 European Fencing Championships
European 2006
Fencing
European Fencing Championships
2000s in İzmir